RNB Fridays Live is an annual concert series held in Australia. The series was co-founded by the Hit Radio Network and Frontier Touring in 2016. The event features several stages featuring musical artists from many genres of music, including  R&B, hip hop, electronic dance music, and pop. The concert series are held in venues across major cities in Australia. The shows are hosted by Fatman Scoop, with DJ Horizon as the resident DJ.

Concert series by year

Box office score data

References 

Rock festivals in Australia
Hip hop music festivals
Music festivals established in 2016